Colorado's 3rd Senate district is one of 35 districts in the Colorado Senate. It has been represented by Democrat Nick Hinrichsen since 2022, following the resignation of Leroy Garcia.

Geography
District 3 is based in the city of Pueblo in Pueblo County, also covering the nearby community of Pueblo West.

The district is located entirely within Colorado's 3rd congressional district, and overlaps with the 46th, 47th, and 62nd districts of the Colorado House of Representatives.

Recent election results

2022
Colorado state senators are elected to staggered four-year terms; under normal circumstances, the 3rd district holds elections in midterm years. The 2022 election will be the first one held under the state's new district lines.

Historical election results

2018

2014

2013 recall
In 2013, an attempt to recall incumbent Democrat Angela Giron over her support for gun control legislation was successful, resulting in the election of Republican George Rivera.

Federal and statewide results in District 3

References 

3
Pueblo County, Colorado